Styraconyx is a genus of tardigrades in the family Styraconyxidae. The genus was named and first described by Gustav Thulin in 1942.

Species
The genus includes thirteen species:
 Styraconyx craticuliformis Chang & Rho, 1998
 Styraconyx craticulus (Pollock, 1983)
 Styraconyx hallasi Kristensen, 1977
 Styraconyx haploceros Thulin, 1942
 Styraconyx kristenseni Renaud-Mornant, 1981
 Styraconyx nanoqsunguak Kristensen & Higgins, 1984 - Nanoqsunguak water bear
 Styraconyx paulae Robotti, 1971
 Styraconyx qivitoq Kristensen & Higgins, 1984 - Qivitoq water bear
 Styraconyx sardiniae D'Addabbo Gallo, Morone De Lucia & Grimaldi de Zio, 1989 - Sardinian water bear
 Styraconyx sargassi Thulin, 1942
 Styraconyx testudo D'Addabbo Gallo, Grimaldi de Zio & Morone De Lucia, 1984
 Styraconyx turbinarium Bartels, Fontoura & Nelson, 2015
 Styraconyx tyrrhenus D'Addabbo Gallo, Morone De Lucia & Grimaldi de Zio, 1989 - Tyrrhenian water bear

References

Further reading
 Thulin (1942), Ein neuer mariner Tardigrad. (A New Underwater Tardigrades) Goteborgs Vetenskaps Samhalles Handlingar, ser. 6, vol. 2B, no. 5, p. 1-10.

Styraconyxidae
Tardigrade genera